John Colquhoun (6 March 1805 – 27 May 1885) was a sportsman and sportswriter in Scotland.

Life
He was born in Edinburgh to James Colquhoun, 3rd Baronet of Luss, Dumbartonshire and Janet Colquhoun (born Sinclair). Together with his elder brother he was educated first at a school in Edinburgh, subsequently at a private school in Lincolnshire (Rev. Mr. Grainger's of Winteringham), and finally at the University of Edinburgh. 

In 1828, he joined the 33rd Regiment in Connaught, Ireland. 
In 1829, he was promoted to the Fourth Dragoon Guards.  He retired from the service after his marriage in 1833, 'and commenced what was termed later by a friend his "Residential tour of Scotland."'

He was always a keen sportsman and an accurate observer of nature, and during his long life he acquired an experience in matters of sport and natural history that was quite exceptional, for the summer quarters were changed almost every year, and the list of places rented by him embraces nearly every district of Scotland, so that his opportunities for observation were especially favourable. 
In 1840, he embodied his experiences in The Moor and the Loch, which speedily took a high rank among books on Scotch sport. 
In 1851, the third edition was published, and the fourth, which was not issued until 1878, contained many additions, notably the most valuable portions of some other books he had written in the meantime, Rocks and Rivers, 1849 ; Salmon Casts and Stray Shots, 1858; and Sporting Days, 1866.

Besides these works he wrote two lectures, "On the Feræ Naturæ of the British Islands,' and 'On Instinct and Reason,' which were published in 1873 and 1874 respectively. 
It was not until the fifth edition of The Moor and the Loch appeared that the autobiographical introduction, which now forms not the least interesting portion of the book, was prefixed to the text, and a sixth edition was issued in 1884, the year before the author's death.

He died on 27 May 1885 at Royal Terrace, Edinburgh, after a short illness.

Family
On 29 January 1834, he married Frances Sarah Fuller Maitland daughter of Ebenezer Fuller Maitland and Bethia Ellis. John and Frances had four sons and five daughters. His daughter Lucy Bethia Walford, became a well-known Victorian novelist, while F. Mary Colquhoun became a poet and writer.

Principal works 
The Moor and the Loch  1840
Rocks and Rivers  1849
Salmon Casts and Stray Shots  1858
Sporting Days  1866

Notes

Attribution

References
"Colquhoun, John" British Authors of the Nineteenth Century  H.C Wilson Company, New York, 1936.
thepeerage.com. Retrieved 28 January 2009
 

1805 births
1885 deaths
Writers from Edinburgh
Alumni of the University of Edinburgh
Scottish sportswriters
4th Royal Irish Dragoon Guards officers
Younger sons of baronets